The Sweet Escape is the second studio album by American singer Gwen Stefani, released on December 1, 2006, by Interscope Records. Having originally intended to return to No Doubt after her debut solo album, Love. Angel. Music. Baby. (2004), Stefani decided to record a second album as a way to release some of the material left over from the Love. Angel. Music. Baby. writing sessions. The album musically resembles its predecessor while exploring more modern pop sounds. It was released to generally mixed reviews from contemporary music critics, receiving criticism for its strong similarities to Love. Angel. Music. Baby.

It was preceded by the lead single "Wind It Up", which charted moderately across the world, and produced the follow-up single "The Sweet Escape", which proved to be more successful worldwide. The Sweet Escape reached the top five in the United States, Canada, and Australia and peaked inside the top 20 in the United Kingdom. The album's supporting tour, The Sweet Escape Tour, kicked off in April 2007, covering North America, Colombia, Australia, Asia, and Europe.

Conception

Background
Following the release of her debut album Love. Angel. Music. Baby., Stefani announced that she had intended to return to No Doubt and record a sixth studio album with the band. After the commercial success of L.A.M.B., she decided to release several leftover tracks from the album as an EP or as extra tracks on a DVD. However, Pharrell Williams, with whom she had collaborated to write "Hollaback Girl", convinced Stefani to create "a L.A.M.B. part two", and the two recorded several songs during sessions in Miami in July 2005.

The two produced "Wind It Up", "Orange County Girl", "U Started It", "Yummy", "Breaking Up", and "Candyland" during these sessions, and the songs were used for a fashion show premiering the 2006 collection of Stefani's fashion line L.A.M.B. She included performances of "Wind It Up" and "Orange County Girl" when she embarked on the Harajuku Lovers Tour in October 2005. Stefani put the project on hold in December 2005 when she discovered that she was pregnant, before returning to the studio in August 2006. The album's working title was Candyland, sharing its name with an unreleased track that has only been looped via her fashion show soundtrack. The title was changed to The Sweet Escape, the title of the second track.

Album cover
The album cover was taken by photographer Jill Greenberg. The image was part of a series of promotional images taken by Greenberg, inspired by her previous End Times exhibition. To create End Times, Greenberg gave lollipops to toddlers but took them back after several moments, provoking emotional outbursts. Greenberg used the images as a representation of American politics and society. Greenberg was accused of child abuse for the photo shoots; Stefani, however, commented, "I didn't think 'child abuse'—I just thought, 'That's beautiful.' Every kid cries [...] Other people reacted like, 'Oh my God. That's so disturbing,' or 'That's so sad.' I guess that's what art's all about. It's supposed to make you think."

Stefani's appearance on the album cover is inspired by that of Elvira Hancock, a cocaine addict portrayed by Michelle Pfeiffer in the 1983 film Scarface. Stefani first gained inspiration for the style while shooting the music video for "Cool" in Lake Como, Italy. During the shoot, Stefani saw her No Doubt bandmate Tony Kanal and his girlfriend, who had on a "long, peach, polyester [late-1970s style] dress". It was this dress that got Stefani thinking "about Michelle Pfeiffer and how amazingly styled she was [in Scarface]", which in turn drew inspiration for the cover. The pair of oversized sunglasses on the album cover is intended to represent her "guarded exterior", and the other images symbolize her various emotions.

Composition

The Sweet Escape is a primarily dance-pop, electropop, and rap album, featuring themes of romantic situations and details of her career and personal life, while sonically the album features "sparsely rhythmic tracks where she chants as much as she sings" and "pop songs that aim for choruses." The album opens with "Wind It Up", which features fanfares and samples from The Sound of Musics "The Lonely Goatherd", having "material-minded lyrics touting her fashion line and her shape." The second and title track, "The Sweet Escape", is a dance-pop and doo wop song, which features Akon providing a "wee-oh!" hook, with lyrics about a "feisty sort of apology." "Orange County Girl" is an autobiographical rap song, where Stefani shows how she is "grateful for her success while recalling the simpler days of her youth." The album's first ballad, "Early Winter", has influences of 1980s soft rock and lyrics about the need for fidelity and transparency in romantic relationship. "Now That You Got It" features military snare drums, loping hip-hop beat and a staccato piano sample. Its lyrics has Stefani "act[ing] as if she's doing a lover a favor and challenges him to come through."

The sixth track "4 in the Morning" is a 1980s-inspired synth-pop ballad that lyrically deals with a relationship on the edge, while "Yummy" is a dance song, with a tribal rhythm, cameo by Pharrell Williams and lyrics that finds Stefani declaring that "making babies leaves her eager to feel sexy again." "Fluorescent" features Angelo Moore on saxophone, and was compared to the works of Madonna and Prince, while "Breakin' Up" has influences of hip hop and electronica and it is "a breakup song built on a dying cell phone metaphor." The tenth track, "Don't Get It Twisted", talks about an unexpected pregnancy, in a song influenced by reggaeton. "U Started It" was noted for having "lilting melody, silken harmonies, and pizzicato strings", while the final track, "Wonderful Life", was named a Depeche Mode-style synth ballad about how much she misses her first love and how the person had a profound impact on her.

Critical reception

The Sweet Escape received mixed reviews from music critics. At Metacritic, which assigns a normalized rating out of 100 to reviews from mainstream publications, the album received an average score of 58, based on 24 reviews. Stephen Thomas Erlewine of AllMusic wrote, "From the stilted production to the fashion fetish, all the way down to her decision to rap on far too much of the album, all the dance-pop here seems like a pose." Alex Miller of NME was more emphatic, dubbing it "this year's bargain-bin fodder", and stated that "the majority of this record serves only to bury what made Gwen Stefani unique in the first place." At Entertainment Weekly, Sia Michel noted that the album "has a surprisingly moody, lightly autobiographical feel" but that "Stefani isn't convincing as a dissatisfied diva". Pitchforks Mark Pytlik described the album's oddities as a career risk for Stefani, where most of the "gonzo pop songs yield some degree of payout" but that Stefani's tight scheduling during production of the album leaves the result "somewhere between the vanguard and the insipid." Paul Flynn of The Observer characterized the album as less interesting than Fergie's The Dutchess and Nelly Furtado's Loose. Robert Christgau cited the song "Yummy" as a "choice cut".

The album received criticism for its similarities to Love. Angel. Music. Baby. Sal Cinquemani of Slant Magazine opined that "[h]istory will likely view The Sweet Escape as a retread of Stefani's well-received solo debut, but it shares that album's general inconsistency and, thus, its peaks and valleys". Rob Sheffield of Rolling Stone agreed, viewing it as "her hasty return" to music lacking the energy of L.A.M.B. and in which "she sounds exhausted." The New York Times Jon Pareles commented that Stefani "rebooks some of the same producers and repeats some of the old tricks with less flair", adding that "superficiality is more fun when it doesn't get so whiny." Caroline Sullivan disagreed in her review for The Guardian, in which she stated that although some of the songs date back to the 2003 writing sessions for L.A.M.B., "generally The Sweet Escape feels minty-fresh." Quentin B. Huff of PopMatters, however, referred to The Sweet Escape as L.A.M.B.: Reloaded and described The Sweet Escape and L.A.M.B. as "the same album, just add more rap, a glossy Next-Top-Model-ish photo for the cover, and a few more recent-sounding influences."

Commercial performance
The Sweet Escape debuted at number three on the Billboard 200, selling 243,000 copies in its first week. It sold another 149,000 copies during its second week, falling to number 14. The album was certified platinum by the Recording Industry Association of America (RIAA) on June 25, 2007, and had sold 1,733,000 copies in the United States by February 2016. The Canadian Recording Industry Association (CRIA) certified The Sweet Escape platinum eight days prior to the album's release, and double platinum on March 5, 2007.

In the United Kingdom, The Sweet Escape debuted at number 26 on the UK Albums Chart with first-week sales of 33,632 copies. Three months later, on March 4, 2007, the album reached a new peak position of number 14. It was certified Platinum by the British Phonographic Industry (BPI) on July 22, 2013 and, as of March 2016, has sold 365,143 copies in the UK. The album was moderately successful across Europe, peaking in the top 10 in Norway and Switzerland; the top 20 in Austria, Finland, Germany, Hungary, Ireland, and Sweden; and the top 40 in Belgium, Denmark, France and the Netherlands. The Sweet Escape reached number two for two consecutive weeks on the ARIA Albums Chart in Australia, and was certified double platinum by the Australian Recording Industry Association (ARIA).

The Sweet Escape Tour

The Sweet Escape Tour was Stefani's follow-up to the Harajuku Lovers Tour. It went worldwide as compared to her previous tour which was constricted only to North America and had more than double the number of shows. It was Stefani's last solo effort as she rejoined her band No Doubt after the tour ended. The main feature were usage of various props such as a prison for Stefani's opening act, a six-piece band and a large multimedia screen in the backdrop showing videos and animations.

The tour had its own set of controversies. A group of students making up for The National Union of Malaysian Muslim Students banned Stefani's concert that was slated to take place on August 21, 2007, at Putra Indoor Stadium in Kuala Lumpur. The union's vice president, Abdul Muntaqim, said, "Her performance and her attire are not suitable for our culture. It promotes a certain degree of obscenity and will encourage youth to emulate the western lifestyle. The concert should be stopped." The organizer of the event, Maxis Communications, later responded, "Stefani has confirmed that her concert will not feature any revealing costumes. She will abide by the Malaysian authorities' guidelines to ensure that her show will not be offensive to local sensitivities." In April 2007, Akon, one of the tour's opening acts, drew criticism for engaging in on-stage dirty dancing with a 14-year-old girl at a club in Port of Spain, Trinidad and Tobago, as part of a fake contest. As a result, Verizon Wireless terminated its sponsorship of the tour.

Stefani donated $166,000 from her October 30, 2007, concert in San Diego to the San Diego Foundation, in benefit of the victims of the October 2007 California wildfires. On her June 22 and June 23 concerts in Irvine, California, Stefani was joined onstage by her No Doubt bandmates. They performed the band's songs "Just a Girl", "Spiderwebs", "Sunday Morning", "Hella Good", and their cover of Talk Talk's "It's My Life".

Track listing

Notes
  signifies an additional producer
  signifies an orchestra producer
  signifies a co-producer
  signifies an additional vocal producer
 "Wind It Up" contains interpolations from the composition "The Lonely Goatherd", written by Richard Rodgers and Oscar Hammerstein.

Personnel
Credits adapted from the liner notes of The Sweet Escape.

Musicians

 Gwen Stefani – vocals
 Talent Bootcamp Kids – additional vocals 
 Pete Davis – additional mix programming ; additional keyboards 
 Akon – vocals, programming, keyboards 
 Giorgio Tuinfort – programming, keyboards 
 Tony Love – guitar 
 Aidan Love – programming 
 Tim Rice-Oxley – piano, keyboards 
 Mark Ralph – guitar 
 Greg Collins – bass guitar ; guitar 
 Loren Dawson – keyboards 
 Sean Garrett – backing vocals 
 Neil Kanal – programming ; keyboards 
 Tony Kanal – programming, keyboards 
 Gabrial McNair – keyboards ; trombone, baritone 
 Matt Beck – guitar 
 Pharrell – vocals 
 Kingston James McGregor Rossdale – baby sounds 
 Angelo Moore – saxophone 
 Alex Dromgoole – guitar ; bass guitar 
 David Emery – guitar 
 Stephen Bradley – trumpet, baritone 
 Scheila Gonzalez – saxophone, flute, clarinet 
 Anthony LoGerfo – percussion 
 Ewan Pearson – programming 
 Martin Gore – guitar 
 Richard Hawley – guitar

Technical

 The Neptunes – production 
 Brian Garten – recording 
 Ron Fair – orchestra production 
 Hart Gunther – engineering assistance 
 Mark "Spike" Stent – additional production ; mixing 
 Alex Dromgoole – engineering assistance 
 David Emery – engineering assistance 
 Akon – production 
 Giorgio Tuinfort – co-production 
 Mark "Exit" Goodchild – recording 
 Bojan Dugic – recording 
 Keith Gretlein – recording 
 Kevin Mills – recording ; engineering assistance 
 Yvan Bing – engineering assistance 
 Rich Travali – mixing 
 Nellee Hooper – production 
 Greg Collins – recording ; additional vocal production ; additional vocals recording 
 Ian Rossiter – engineering assistance 
 Swizz Beatz – production 
 Sean Garrett – co-production 
 Angel Aponte – additional recording 
 Glenn Pittman – engineering assistance 
 Steve Tolle – engineering assistance 
 Tony Kanal – production 
 Neil Kanal – recording 
 Colin Mitchell – recording 
 Andrew Alekel – recording 
 Dror Mohar – engineering assistance 
 Andrew Coleman – recording 
 Ryan Kennedy – engineering assistance 
 Phil Tan – mixing 
 Julian Chan – recording 
 Jonathan Merritt – recording 
 Jason Finkel – engineering assistance 
 Simon Gogerly – recording 
 Brian "Big Bass" Gardner – mastering at Bernie Grundman Mastering (Hollywood, California)

Artwork
 Jill Greenberg – photography, fine art concept
 Jolie Clemens – art direction, layout
 Nicole Frantz – photography, art and packaging coordination
 Cindy Cooper – photography, art and packaging coordination

Charts

Weekly charts

Year-end charts

Certifications

Release history

Notes

References

2006 albums
Albums produced by Akon
Albums produced by Nellee Hooper
Albums produced by the Neptunes
Albums produced by Sean Garrett
Albums produced by Swizz Beatz
Albums recorded at Capitol Studios
Albums recorded at Electric Lady Studios
Gwen Stefani albums
Interscope Geffen A&M Records albums
Interscope Records albums